The canton of Melle is an administrative division of the Deux-Sèvres department, western France. Its borders were modified at the French canton reorganisation which came into effect in March 2015. Its seat is in Melle.

It consists of the following communes:
 
Alloinay
Aubigné
Caunay
La Chapelle-Pouilloux
Chef-Boutonne
Clussais-la-Pommeraie
Couture-d'Argenson
Fontenille-Saint-Martin-d'Entraigues
Fontivillié
Limalonges
Lorigné
Loubigné
Loubillé
Mairé-Levescault
Maisonnay
Marcillé
Melle
Melleran
Montalembert
Pers
Pliboux
Saint-Romans-lès-Melle
Saint-Vincent-la-Châtre
Sauzé-Vaussais
Valdelaume
Villemain

References

Cantons of Deux-Sèvres